Mariken is a 2000 Dutch film directed by André van Duren. The screenplay is based on Peter van Gestel's children's book Mariken, an adaptation of the early sixteenth-century text Mariken van Nieumeghen.

Plot
The story is set in the Middle Ages. Mariken is an orphan who was raised by an old man and his goat in a forest. When the goat dies Mariken decides to go to town and buy a new one. On her way she comes across many people who are either sympathetic to her or want to do her harm...

Cast
Laurien Van den Broeck - Mariken
Jan Decleir - Archibald (Theodore)
Willeke van Ammelrooy - Griet
Kim van Kooten - Isabella
Ramsey Nasr - Joachim
Dora van der Groen - Zwarte Weeuw
Willem Van den Broeck - Rattenjan
Geert Lageveen - Broeder Willem

External links 
 
 https://web.archive.org/web/20150523204143/http://www.filmtotaal.nl/nederlandse_film.php?id=818

2000 films
2000s Dutch-language films
Films set in the Middle Ages
Dutch children's films
Films directed by André van Duren